Tara Campbell (born July 21, 1983 in Montreal, Quebec) is a Canadian water polo player. She is a member of the Women's National Team that claimed the bronze medal at the 2005 World Aquatics Championships in Montreal, Quebec, and the silver medal at the 2009 World Aquatics Championships in Rome, Italy.  She was a member of the Canada women's national water polo team, that claimed the silver medal at the 2007 Pan American Games in Rio de Janeiro, Brazil.  Tara was also a member of the Canadian Junior National team that won the gold medal at 2003 World Junior Championships in Calgary, Alberta, Canada.

Campbell studied at California State University, Long Beach. There she graduated in 2006 with a Bachelor of Business Administration degree, with a major in Finance.

See also
 List of World Aquatics Championships medalists in water polo

References
 Profile

External links
 

1983 births
Living people
Long Beach State Beach women's water polo players
Canadian female water polo players
Water polo players from Montreal
Anglophone Quebec people
Water polo players at the 2007 Pan American Games
Water polo players at the 2011 Pan American Games
World Aquatics Championships medalists in water polo
Pan American Games silver medalists for Canada
Pan American Games medalists in water polo
Medalists at the 2011 Pan American Games